Xhelal Sveçla is a Kosovo–Albanian dentist and politician, currently serving as the Minister of Internal Affairs and Public Administration in the Second Kurti cabinet. He was formerly a Member of Parliament, then First Deputy Minister of Internal Affairs, and acting Minister.

Sveçla began his studies at the dentistry school of the University of Prishtina in 1990, but transferred to the University of Tirana, where he obtained his degree. As a student leader, he was among the organizers of protests against the Serbian occupation of Kosovo in the 1990s and served as an executive officer in the Independent Student Union of the University of Prishtina. In 1998, he joined the Kosovo Liberation Army.

Sveçla worked with various organizations in Prishtina and Tirana, as coordinator for International Medical Corps Tirana and national director of SOS Kinderdorf International, which focused on helping disadvantaged children. In 2003, Sveçla became part of the Kosova Action Network (KAN), a civil society organization that sought social change through citizen activism. KAN was a predecessor of the Vetëvendosje Movement, which was formed in 2005.

In 2013, Sveçla was appointed director of the inspectorate the Municipality of Prishtina, where he helped institute rule of law and improve oversight. He was a member of the Kosovo parliament with the Vetëvendosje caucus in the 6th legislature, serving as deputy chairman and later chairman of the committee on communities. He was also a member of the internal affairs committee and chairman of the investigative committee on the kidnapping of six Turkish citizens.

He became first deputy minister of internal affairs in the first Kurti government in February 2020. He was then acting minister from 19 March to 3 June, when a new government was voted in. He returned to government with the second Kurti cabinet as minister of internal affairs on 22 March 2021.

References 

Albanian politicians
Living people
Year of birth missing (living people)